Psectrotarsia is a genus of moths of the family Noctuidae.

Species
 Psectrotarsia euposis (Dyar, 1912)
 Psectrotarsia flava Dognin, 1907
 Psectrotarsia hebardi (Skinner, 1917)
 Psectrotarsia rhodophora (Hampson, 1910)
 Psectrotarsia suavis (H. Edwards, 1884)

References
Natural History Museum Lepidoptera genus database
Revision of the Genus Psectrotarsia Dognin, 1907 (Lepidoptera: Noctuidae:Heliothinae)

Heliothinae